Savoy Grill may refer to:

Savoy Hotel Grill Room, commonly known as the Grill Room restaurant, located in the Savoy Hotel in London
Savoy Hotel and Grill, the oldest restaurant in Kansas City, Missouri, opened in 1903